WCLS (97.7 FM) is a radio station licensed to Spencer, Indiana, United States, the station serves the Bloomington, Indiana area with a Classic Hits format.  The station is currently owned by Mid-America Radio of Indiana.

History
The station went on the air as WLSO on March 14, 1983. On August 18, 1988, the station changed its call sign to WSKT. It again changed its call sign on October 23, 2005, to its present name of WCLS.

The call letters were previously assigned to a station in Columbus, Georgia (now WIOL), to a station in Detroit, Michigan (now WYCD), and to a station in Oscoda, Michigan (now WWTH).

References

External links

CLS